vzRoom is a software system developed by Manipeer Limited for multi-party video conferencing, media sharing and VoIP phone integration. It was launched in July 2008.

Features

Multi-party videoconferencing
Each conference room supports up to 63 concurrent users. Each user has an own room to host individual videoconferencing meeting and all users can share voice, camera and other multimedia to the users in the videoconferencing room. The meeting will be coordinated by the host of the room.

Media sharing
 Screen sharing
 Synchronous video sharing
 Multiple-user whiteboard
 Remote desktop
 File transfer
 Instant messaging

VoIP phone integration
vzRoom clients can connect to VoIP phone and merge the phone call with the conference room users.

Other features
 Discussion and presentation modes
 Scheduler
 Videoconferencing recording

Applications
 Videoconferencing
 Distance education
 Karaoke

Implementation
 Server installation: vzRoom allows users to build their own server.

References

External links
 

2008 software
File sharing software
Shareware
Videotelephony
VoIP software
Instant messaging